This is a list of films produced by the Tollywood film industry based in Hyderabad, Telangana in 1958.

1958
Telugu
Telugu films